The Cowboys–Giants rivalry is a National Football League (NFL) rivalry between the Dallas Cowboys and New York Giants. The beginning of this rivalry is difficult to trace, but is perhaps best defined by the first game the two teams ever played back in 1960, which resulted in a 31–31 tie. In the early 1960s the New York Giants were beginning to wind down as an NFL powerhouse. After having been arguably the most dominant team in the Eastern Conference through the 1950s and early 1960s the Giants entered a period of poor play where they did not make the playoffs from 1964–80. While the Giants dominated the Cowboys in the first few years of the rivalry, the Cowboys picked up steam and took control from the mid-1960s to the early 1980s, winning 17 of the 20 meetings between the two teams in the 1970s. In the 1980s however the Giants struck back, and the rivalry has been relatively even handed ever since with intermittent spurts of dominance (the Giants in the late 1980s and the Cowboys in the early 1990s). The rivalry would also swing in favor of the Giants during the 2000s and early 2010s. Recent history has swung back in favor of the Cowboys, as they have beaten the Giants nine out of the last ten matchups since 2017. This is a unique rivalry in American sports in that no other Texas area team is in the same division as a New York area team, or has a consistent rivalry with one, most likely due to the relatively far geographical distance between the two regions (though during the 1960s, the New York Jets were division rivals with the Houston Oilers in the American Football League East Division).

Another important facet of this rivalry is Hall of Fame coach Tom Landry. Landry was one of the most fateful figures in the history of both franchises. Drafted by the Giants in 1947, it would be three more years before he actually played with them. He played multiple roles – defensive back, halfback, and quarterback – and in those roles he recorded one rushing touchdown, one passing touchdown, two touchdowns off fumble recoveries, and three touchdowns off INTs. He made one Pro Bowl as a player, in 1954, the same season he joined the Giants' coaching staff. After he retired as a player at the end of the 1955 season, he became the Giants' defensive coordinator inventing the 4-3 Defense, serving in that role through 1959. In 1960, he became head coach of the first-year Cowboys and in his 29 seasons went 35–16-2 against the Giants. According to “The Last Cowboy: A Life of Tom Landry,” by Long Island author Mark Ribowsky, Tom Landry's widow, Alicia, claims that after the way the Jones family treated her husband when they purchased the team, that the long-time coach no longer followed the team and went back to being a fan of the Giants until his death in 2000.

Notable rivalry moments

1960s
Cowboys 31, Giants 31 (December 4, 1960) – The first meeting between the Cowboys and Giants occurred in 1960 at Yankee Stadium.  The game ended in a 31–31 tie. Eddie LeBaron threw three touchdowns for Dallas including two in the fourth quarter, while George Shaw and Lee Grosscup combined for three touchdown throws for the Giants. L. G. Dupree ran for a Dallas touchdown and caught two scores.  This was the first game in franchise history in which the Cowboys did not lose, as they opened their inaugural season with ten straight losses.

1970s
Cowboys 20, Giants 13 (October 11, 1971) – The Cowboys defeated the Giants 20–13 in the first Monday Night Football meeting between the teams and the last NFL game at the Cotton Bowl.

1980s
Giants 13, Cowboys 10 (OT) (December 19, 1981) – The Giants defeated the Cowboys 13–10 in overtime on a frigid Saturday afternoon in Giants Stadium to clinch the Giants' first playoff berth in 17 seasons. Joe Danelo kicked the winning field goal in overtime after missing a potential game-winner earlier in the extra period.

1990s
Cowboys 16, Giants 13 (OT) (January 2, 1994) – In the final game of the 1993 season, with both teams at 11–4 and competing for the #1 seed in the NFC playoffs, Cowboys running back Emmitt Smith suffered a separated right shoulder in the first half, but continued to play in obvious pain, amassing 168 rushing yards, including 41 on the game-winning drive, as Dallas won 16–13 in overtime. Smith also locked up the NFL rushing title with his tough, gritty performance. After the game, sportscaster John Madden paid a visit to Smith in the locker room to congratulate him, the only time Madden (as an announcer) would pay such a visit to a player, later writing "[It] was one of the toughest efforts I've ever seen by any football player in any game."[8] The loss meant the Giants were the #4 seed, while the win earned the Cowboys the #1 seed (and a bye in the playoffs), giving Smith time to heal, and he would go on to lead the Cowboys to victory over the Buffalo Bills as the MVP of Super Bowl XXVIII. Meanwhile, the Giants would defeat the Minnesota Vikings 17-10 in the Wild Card round before falling to the San Francisco 49ers the following week.
Cowboys 38, Giants 10 (November 7, 1994) – The 7–1 Cowboys hosted the 3–5 Giants as two-time defending Super Bowl champions. After a scoreless first quarter, a touchdown pass from Troy Aikman to Alvin Harper and a one-yard Emmitt Smith rushing score left the Cowboys up 14–3. On the final play of the first half, Aikman launched a long pass to Harper in the end zone; Harper was hit in mid-air by Giants safety Tito Wooten and suffered a sprained left knee. Cowboys receivers coach Hubbard Alexander then attacked Jarvis Williams of the Giants and Michael Irvin punched Williams with a helmet. As the brawl escalated, Cowboys safety James Washington grabbed a camera and monopod from a local photographer and brandished it like a sword, yelling for Giants players to take him on. Irvin was fined $12,000 and Washington $10,000 by the league. When order was finally restored, the Cowboys defeated the Giants 38–10.
Giants 13, Cowboys 10 (October 18, 1999) – The 2-3 Giants hosted the 3-1 Cowboys, who had just come off a crushing loss to the Philadelphia Eagles in a game that saw Michael Irvin's career end on a spinal cord injury, on Monday Night Football. The Giants offense was stagnant most of the evening, but two missed Dallas field goals and a red zone interception by safety Sam Garnes kept the score low, while Emmitt Smith was held to just 26 yards rushing on 22 carries. The game was tied 3-3 in the fourth quarter before Tiki Barber returned a Toby Gowin punt 85 yards for a touchdown. With two minutes left, Smith tied the game with a two-yard touchdown run; but on the ensuing drive, quarterback Kent Graham found Barber out of the backfield for a 56-yard catch-and-run all the way down to the three-yard line. A 21-yard field goal by Brad Daluiso gave the Giants the lead with one second remaining. The final kickoff saw Deion Sanders scrambling to the 25-yard line before pitching the ball to Kevin Mathis, who dashed all the way to New York's 20 before lateraling to Singor Mobley, who raced all the way to the endzone. However, Sanders was flagged for an illegal forward pass, ending the game in a Giants win. Barber finished with 233 all-purpose yards, as the Giants defeated the Cowboys for the first time on Monday Night Football after losing the first seven meetings.

2000s
Cowboys 35, Giants 32 (September 15, 2003) – In 2003, the teams met at Giants Stadium on Monday Night Football. The game marked former Giants head coach Bill Parcells' first visit to Giants Stadium as head coach of the Cowboys. The Cowboys led 29–14 after three quarters, but they lost the lead over the last 15 minutes, and found themselves down 32–29 with 11 seconds to play. The Giants simply needed to kick off and play a "prevent" defense for 1 or 2 plays, but the kickoff went out of bounds, putting the Cowboys at their own 40 with no time elapsed, and Quincy Carter completed a deep pass to Antonio Bryant, who went out of bounds at the New York 34 to stop the clock with four seconds left. Billy Cundiff then converted a 52-yard field goal as time expired to send the game to overtime, and kicked a 25 yard field goal in the extra session to win the game for the Cowboys. Cundiff tied an NFL record with seven field goals in the game 35–32.
Giants 21, Cowboys 17 (January 13, 2008) – In 2007, the Cowboys swept the Giants in the regular season, winning the NFC East with a record of 13–3 and No. 1 Seed in the NFC.  However, in the division round of the playoffs, the 5-seed Giants (10–6) went into Texas Stadium and stunned the top-seeded Cowboys 21–17 en route to winning Super Bowl XLII against the New England Patriots. 
Cowboys 20, Giants 8 (December 14, 2008) – Amid several weeks of off-field acrimony involving Terrell Owens, Tony Romo, Jason Witten, Marion Barber, and owner Jerry Jones, the Cowboys shut down the Giants in New York's final trip to Texas Stadium (and first since the 2007 playoffs), 20–8. Owens and Witten combined for eight catches for 82 yards while Patrick Crayton and Deon Anderson had two receiving scores. Romo completed 20 of 30 throws for 244 yards despite being sacked four times (once for a Giants safety) and injuring his back in the process. The Cowboys sacked Giants quarterback Eli Manning eight times and limited him to only 191 passing yards and two interceptions snatched by Terence Newman.
Giants 33, Cowboys 31 (September 20, 2009) – Lawrence Tynes made a 37-yard field goal as the game clock expired to give the Giants a 33–31 victory over the Cowboys and spoil the opening of the new Cowboys Stadium, with a crowd of a record-breaking 105,121 people. After the game, Giants quarterback Eli Manning signed the wall of the visiting locker room, and wrote "'33–31' First win in the new stadium" next to his name.

2010s
Giants 41, Cowboys 35 (October 25, 2010) – the Giants defeated the Cowboys in Cowboys Stadium 41–35, leaving the Cowboys at a disappointing 1–5 for the year. This contest is notable for the Giants linebacker Michael Boley driving Tony Romo to the turf and causing Romo to break his left clavicle and most likely ending the Cowboys chances at a playoff run.
Cowboys 33, Giants 20 (November 14, 2010) – Jason Garrett made his head coaching debut for the Cowboys in the 2010 rematch against the Giants on November 14. The Cowboys raced to a 19-3 lead and won 33-20, intercepting Eli Manning twice (Bryan McCann picked off Manning in the end zone and scored from 101 yards out) while Jon Kitna had three touchdowns. 
Giants 37, Cowboys 34 (December 11, 2011) – During the teams' first meeting of the season, with the NFC East lead on the line, the Cowboys led the Giants 34–22 with 5:41 left to play. Eli Manning led the Giants to a comeback by scoring 15 points, and the Giants' Jason Pierre-Paul blocked Dallas kicker Dan Bailey's game-tying field goal with 6 seconds remaining. The Giants took a knee with 1 second left, and won the game 37–34. This game was selected as #2 on Top 20 NFL Games of 2011.
Giants 31, Cowboys 14 (January 1, 2012) – The Giants hosted the Cowboys in what amounted to a de facto NFC East championship game.  Both teams entered the game with identical 8–7 records and a share of the lead of the NFC East.  With the division title and a playoff berth on the line the game was flexed to the 8:30 pm Sunday Night Football slot.  While the Giants took a 21–0 halftime lead, Tony Romo brought the Cowboys back, making the score 21–14 early in the 4th quarter.  The Giants would hold on however, winning 31–14 and earning their first NFC East Division title and playoff berth since 2008 while knocking the Cowboys out of the playoffs. The Giants eventually won Super Bowl XLVI against the New England Patriots.
Giants 29, Cowboys 24 (October 28, 2012) – The Cowboys and the Giants played for a second time in the 2012 season at Dallas. The Giants looked to avenge themselves after losing the season opening game to the Cowboys at home. The Giants took an astounding 23–0 lead in the 2nd quarter partly because of three Tony Romo interceptions. The Cowboys rallied up to make the game 23–10 before halftime. The Cowboys, took the third quarter 14–0 to take a 24–23 lead. Eli Manning led two successful drives for New York both resulting in a field goal regaining a 29–24 lead. The Cowboys had less than four minutes to score a touchdown and take the lead. On fourth down, in the Giants territory, Tony Romo was pressured and forced to throw yet another interception. The Cowboys used all three remaining timeouts during that Giants' possession and forced the Giants to punt and got the ball back with under a minute remaining. Tony Romo threw a pass into the end zone with ten seconds left to Dez Bryant and the play was ruled a touchdown. The play was reviewed and the officials noticed that the first part of the receiver to touch the ground was his hand, which was partially out of bounds. The call was reversed and the play was ruled an incomplete pass. The Cowboys failed to score a touchdown and the Giants held on to win 29–24.
Cowboys 31, Giants 28 (November 23, 2014) – In the second meeting during the 2014 season, Giants wide receiver Odell Beckham Jr. had 10 catches for 146 yards and two touchdowns, including a one-handed touchdown reception hailed as the "catch of the year", with Cris Collinsworth, Tony Dungy, and Victor Cruz all saying that it was one of the best catches ever. Beckham made this catch despite a pass interference penalty called on Dallas's Brandon Carr while diving backwards with full extension of his right hand using only three fingers. On December 8, 2014 the Pro Football Hall of Fame put Beckham's game-worn jersey from his famous one-handed catch game vs. Dallas on display. While that score made it 14-3 in favor of the Giants, the Cowboys rallied back, winning the game on Romo's 13-yard touchdown pass to Bryant with 1:01 to go in the fourth quarter to secure a come-from-behind 31-28 win and complete a season sweep of the series. 
Giants 10, Cowboys 7 (December 11, 2016) –  The Giants and Cowboys met again at MetLife Stadium in Week 14 of the 2016 season in a showdown on Sunday Night Football. The Cowboys were riding 11-1 while the Giants were just coming off a tough loss to the Pittsburgh Steelers. The Cowboys were the favorite to win, but the Giants only allowed one touchdown to the Cowboys as the Giants won again 10-7 sweeping the Cowboys for the first time since 2011.
Cowboys 37, Giants 18 (November 4, 2019) – During the team's second meeting of the 2019 season on Monday Night Football, a black cat ran onto the field at MetLife Stadium with the Giants leading 9-3 and delayed the game for two minutes until it left. Afterward, the Cowboys went on to beat the Giants for a 37-18 win.  The incident led to social media memes and videos spoofing the cat as an NFL player, some of which used Kevin Harlan’s bemused radio call of the cat running into the end zone.

2020s
Giants 23, Cowboys 19 (January 3, 2021) – The Giants held off a late Cowboys rally to win 23–19; with the entire NFC East slumping to a possible three-way division tie at 6–10. The Giants win would allow them to clinch the NFC East if the Washington Football Team lost their game to the Philadelphia Eagles later that night.  However, Washington won its game and clinched the division title.
2021 NFL Draft Day Trade (April 29, 2021) – During the 2021 NFL draft, In a rare collaborative move, the Eagles traded a third round pick and their 12th overall pick for Dallas's 10th overall pick.  The purpose of this trade for the Eagles was to select Heisman Trophy winning wide receiver DeVonta Smith ahead of fellow divisional rivals, the New York Giants, who were sitting in the 11th spot. This move reportedly made the Giants front office "livid".
Cowboys 44, Giants 20 (October 10, 2021) – The Cowboys decimated the Giants 44-20 in a grossly one-sided game.  Early in the game, starting New York Giants quarterback Daniel Jones was badly concussed and left the game after getting hit in the head by Dallas rookie linebacker, Jabril Cox. Later in the game, during a massive scuffle between the two teams, 1st Round rookie Kadarius Toney, threw a punch at Dallas safety Damontae Kazee and was immediately ejected.  In the days that followed, Giants tight end Evan Engram claimed Cowboys safety Jayron Kearse "sucker punched" him by stating, "I walked up on him. He walked up on me kinda, saying some stuff. He threw the punch. We had some guys there that separated us, so it was kind of boom, boom. He stole one off..." Engram also stated, "It was a little baby punch anyway. It was soft".  Jayron Kearse later denied the claim on Twitter, "Boy said I punched him lol. He’s nuts". Fox executives deferred to the NFL when asked to supply video of the incident. A league spokesman said that NFL Films employees checked and that there is no video of the incident in question.
Cowboys 23, Giants 16 (September 26, 2022) – Subbing for injured starter Dak Prescott, former Giants backup quarterback Cooper Rush led the team to victory. After cornerback Trevon Diggs came away with a game-sealing interception late in the fourth quarter, Dallas’ offense marched onto the field with 1:14 remaining on the clock to kneel out the rest of the game. Instead of getting a head start on the post-game handshakes, however, players from both teams started jawing back and forth until a full-on skirmish broke out on the field.

Game results

|-
| 
| Tie 0–0–1
| no game
| Tie  31–31
| Tie  0–0–1
| Cowboys join NFL as an expansion team. The teams only played one game as Cowboys were placed in the Western Division and Giants were in the Eastern division.
|-
| 
| Tie 1–1
| style="| Giants  31–10
| style="| Cowboys  17–16
| Tie  1–1–1
| Cowboys moved to the Eastern division with the addition of the Minnesota Vikings to the NFL. The Cowboys and Giants would play two games annually beginning in 1961. Giants lose 1961 NFL Championship Game.
|-
| 
| style="| 
| style="| Giants  41–10
| style="| Giants  41–31
| Giants  3–1–1
| Giants' first two-game sweep in the history of the rivalry. Giants lose 1962 NFL Championship Game.
|-
| 
| style="| 
| style="| Giants  34–27
| style="| Giants  37–21
| Giants  5–1–1
| Giants lose 1963 NFL Championship Game.
|-
| 
| style="| 
| Tie  13–13
| style="| Cowboys  31–21
| Giants  5–2–2
|
|-
| 
| style="| 
| style="| Cowboys  31–2
| style="| Cowboys  38–20
| Giants  5–4–2
| Cowboys' first season sweep in the history of the rivalry.
|-
| 
| style="| 
| style="| Cowboys  52–7
| style="| Cowboys  17–7
| Cowboys  6–5–2
| Cowboys' 52–7 win is the largest margin of victory in the rivalry. Cowboys lose 1966 NFL Championship Game.
|-
| 
| style="| 
| style="| Cowboys  38–24
| no game
| Cowboys  7–5–2
| NFL expansion results in a split of each conference into two divisions. The Cowboys are placed in the Capitol Division, while the Giants and New Orleans Saints alternate between the Capitol and Century Divisions each year. This results in only a single meeting between the Giants and Cowboys in 1967 and 1969. Cowboys lose 1967 NFL Championship.
|-
| 
| Tie 1–1
| style="| Giants  27–21
| style="| Cowboys  28–10
| Cowboys  8–6–2
| 
|-
| 
| style="| 
| style="| Cowboys  25–3
| no game
| Cowboys  9–6–2
| 
|-

|-
| 
| Tie 1–1
| style="| Cowboys  28–10
| style="| Giants  23–20
| Cowboys  10–7–2
| AFL-NFL merger. Both teams placed in the NFC East. Cowboys lose Super Bowl V.
|-
| 
| style="| 
| style="| Cowboys  20–13
| style="| Cowboys  42–14
| Cowboys  12–7–2
| Cowboys win Super Bowl VI.
|-
| 
| Tie 1–1
| style="| Giants  23–3
| style="| Cowboys  23–14
| Cowboys  13–8–2
| Cowboys open Texas Stadium in Irving, Texas. 
|-
| 
| style="| 
| style="| Cowboys  45–28
| style="| Cowboys  23–10
| Cowboys  15–8–2
| Giants move to the Yale Bowl in New Haven, Connecticut.
|-
| 
| Tie 1–1
| style="| Giants  14–6
| style="| Cowboys  21–7
| Cowboys  16–9–2
|
|-
| 
| style="| 
| style="| Cowboys  14–3
| style="| Cowboys  13–7
| Cowboys  18–9–2
| Giants move to Shea Stadium in New York. Cowboys lose Super Bowl X.
|-
| 
| style="| 
| style="| Cowboys  9–3
| style="| Cowboys  24–14
| Cowboys  20–9–2
| Giants open Giants Stadium in East Rutherford, New Jersey.
|-
| 
| style="| 
| style="| Cowboys  41–21
| style="| Cowboys  24–10
| Cowboys  22–9–2
| Cowboys win Super Bowl XII.
|-
| 
| style="| 
| style="| Cowboys  24–3
| style="| Cowboys  34–24
| Cowboys  24–9–2
| Cowboys lose Super Bowl XIII.
|-
| 
| style="| 
| style="| Cowboys  28–7
| style="| Cowboys  16–14
| Cowboys  26–9–2
| Giants draft Phil Simms. Cowboys win 9 straight road meetings against the Giants.
|-

|-
| 
| Tie 1–1
| style="| Cowboys  24–3
| style="| Giants  38–35
| Cowboys  27–10–2
| Cowboys win 12 straight meetings (1974–1980).
|-
| 
| Tie 1–1
| style="| Cowboys  18–10
| style="| Giants  13–10(OT)
| Cowboys  28–11–2
| Giants clinch first playoff berth since 1963 with their OT win coupled with a Green Bay loss the following day in the final week of the regular season.
|-
| 
|colspan="3"| No games
| Cowboys  28–11–2
| Both games cancelled as a result of the 1982 players strike reducing the season to nine games.
|-
| 
| style="| 
| style="| Cowboys  28–13
| style="| Cowboys  38–20
| Cowboys  30–11–2
| 
|-
| 
| style="| 
| style="| Giants  19–7
| style="| Giants  28–7
| Cowboys  30–13–2
| Giants' first season sweep since 1963.
|-
| 
| style="| 
| style="| Cowboys  28–21
| style="| Cowboys  30–29
| Cowboys  32–13–2
| 
|-
| 
| Tie 1–1
| style="| Cowboys  31–28
| style="| Giants  17–14
| Cowboys  33–14–2
| Giants win Super Bowl XXI.
|-
| 
| style="| 
| style="| Cowboys  33–24
| style="| Cowboys  16–14
| Cowboys  35–14–2
| 
|-
| 
| style="| 
| style="| Giants  12–10
| style="| Giants  29–21
| Cowboys  35–16–2
| Tom Landry's final season as Cowboys head coach.
|-
| 
| style="| 
| style="| Giants  30–13
| style="| Giants  15–0
| Cowboys  35–18–2
| Cowboys draft Troy Aikman.
|-

|-
| 
| style="| 
| style="| Giants  28–7
| style="| Giants  31–17
| Cowboys  35–20–2
| Giants win Super Bowl XXV.
|-
| 
| Tie 1–1
| style="| Cowboys  21–16
| style="| Giants  22–9
| Cowboys  36–21–2
| 
|-
| 
| style="| 
| style="| Cowboys  30–3
| style="| Cowboys  34–28
| Cowboys  38–21–2
| Cowboys win Super Bowl XXVII. Game in Dallas played on Thanksgiving.
|-
| 
| style="| 
| style="| Cowboys  31–9
| style="| Cowboys  16–13(OT)
| Cowboys  40–21–2
| Cowboys win final game of the season in New York with the NFC's #1 seed at stake, which dropped the Giants to the #4 seeded wild card. Cowboys win Super Bowl XXVIII. Phil Simms' final season.
|-
| 
| Tie 1–1
| style="| Cowboys  38–10
| style="| Giants  15–10
| Cowboys  41–22–2
| 
|-
| 
| style="| 
| style="| Cowboys  21–20
| style="| Cowboys  35–0
| Cowboys  43–22–2
| Cowboys win Super Bowl XXX.
|-
| 
| Tie 1–1
| style="| Cowboys  27–0
| style="| Giants  20–6
| Cowboys  44–23–2
|  
|-
| 
| style="| 
| style="| Giants  20–7
| style="| Giants  20–17
| Cowboys  44–25–2
|
|-
| 
| style="| 
| style="| Cowboys  16–6
| style="| Cowboys  31–7
| Cowboys  46–25–2
| 
|-
| 
| Tie 1–1
| style="| Cowboys  26–18
| style="| Giants  13–10
| Cowboys  47–26–2
| 
|-

|-
| 
| style="| 
| style="| Giants  17–13
| style="| Giants  19–14
| Cowboys  47–28–2
| Giants lose Super Bowl XXXV. Troy Aikman's final season.
|-
| 
| Tie 1–1
| style="| Cowboys  20–13
| style="| Giants  27–24
| Cowboys  48–29–2
| 
|-
| 
| style="| 
| style="| Giants  21–17
| style="| Giants  37–7
| Cowboys  48–31–2
| 
|-
| 
| style="| 
| style="| Cowboys  19–3
| style="| Cowboys  35–32(OT)
| Cowboys  50–31–2
| Cowboys kicker Billy Cundiff kicks seven field goals in the game in East Rutherford, an NFL record.
|-
| 
| style="| 
| style="| Giants  26–10
| style="| Giants  28–24
| Cowboys  50–33–2
|
|-
| 
| Tie 1–1
| style="| Cowboys  16–13
| style="| Giants  17–10
| Cowboys  51–34–2
|
|-
| 
| Tie 1–1
| style="| Giants  36–22
| style="| Cowboys  23–20
| Cowboys  52–35–2
| First time since 1974 that the road team won both meetings.
|-
| 
| style="| 
| style="| Cowboys  45–35
| style="| Cowboys  31–20
| Cowboys  54–35–2
| Giants win Super Bowl XLII.
|- style="background:#f2f2f2; font-weight:bold;"
|  2007 Playoffs
| style="| 
| style="| Giants  21–17
| 
|  Cowboys  54–36–2
|  NFC Divisional Round. Only playoff meeting between the two teams. Last playoff game played at Texas Stadium.
|-
| 
| Tie 1–1
| style="| Cowboys  20–8
| style="| Giants  35–14
| Cowboys  55–37–2
| 
|-
| 
| style="| 
| style="| Giants  33–31
| style="| Giants  31–24
| Cowboys  55–39–2
| Cowboys open AT&T Stadium in Arlington, Texas (then known as "Cowboys Stadium"). Giants' win in Dallas was the first game played at the new stadium.
|-

|-
| 
| Tie 1–1
| style="| Giants  41–35
| style="| Cowboys  33–20
| Cowboys  56–40–2
| Giants open MetLife Stadium (then known as "New Meadowlands Stadium").
|-
| 
| style="| 
| style="| Giants  37–34
| style="| Giants  31–14
| Cowboys  56–42–2
| Game in New York was the final game of the regular season and a de facto NFC East championship game. The Giants won to clinch the division and the Cowboys were left out of the playoffs. Giants win Super Bowl XLVI.
|-
| 
| Tie 1–1
| style="| Giants  29–24
| style="| Cowboys  24–17
| Cowboys  57–43–2
| Game in New York was the NFL Kickoff Game.
|-
| 
| style="| 
| style="| Cowboys  36–31
| style="| Cowboys  24–21
| Cowboys  59–43–2
| 
|-
| 
| style="| 
| style="| Cowboys  31–21
| style="| Cowboys  31–28
| Cowboys  61–43–2
| Giants wide receiver Odell Beckham Jr. makes famous one-handed catch during their home game.
|-
| 
| Tie 1–1
| style="| Cowboys  27–26
| style="| Giants  27–20
| Cowboys  62–44–2
| 
|-
| 
| style="| 
| style="| Giants  20–19
| style="| Giants  10–7
| Cowboys  62–46–2
| Tony Romo's final season.
|-
| 
| style="| 
| style="| Cowboys  19–3
| style="| Cowboys  30–10
| Cowboys  64–46–2
| 
|-
| 
| style="| 
| style="| Cowboys  20–13
| style="| Cowboys  36–35
| Cowboys  66–46–2
| 
|-
| 
| style="| 
| style="| Cowboys  35–17
| style="| Cowboys  37–18
| Cowboys  68–46–2
| Eli Manning's final season. Black cat appears during game in New York.
|-

|-
| 
| Tie 1–1
| style="| Cowboys  37–34
| style="| Giants  23–19
| Cowboys  69–47–2
| Cowboys win seven straight meetings (2017–2020). Cowboys quarterback Dak Prescott suffers season-ending ankle injury during game in Dallas; backup Andy Dalton leads team to win. Giants eliminate Cowboys from playoff contention with win in New York.
|-
| 
| style="| 
| style="| Cowboys  44–20
| style="| Cowboys  21–6
| Cowboys  71–47–2
| 
|-
| 
| style="| 
| style="| Cowboys  28–20
| style="| Cowboys  23–16
| Cowboys  73–47–2
| Game in Dallas played on Thanksgiving was the most-watched NFL regular-season game on record, with an average of 42 million viewers. 
|- 

|-
| Regular season
| style="|Cowboys 73–46–2
| Cowboys 40–20–1
| Cowboys 33–26–1
| 
|-
| Postseason
| style="|Giants 1–0
| Giants 1–0
| no games
| 2007 NFC Divisional playoffs
|-
| Regular and postseason 
| style="|Cowboys 73–47–2
| Cowboys 40–21–1
| Cowboys 33–26–1
| 
|-

References

National Football League rivalries
New York Giants
Dallas Cowboys
Dallas Cowboys rivalries
New York Giants rivalries